The 2 Johnnies are an Irish comedy duo  (Johnny "Smacks" McMahon and Johnny "Johnny B" O'Brien) from Tipperary, known for their The 2 Johnnies podcast, YouTube channel, live shows and as presenters on RTÉ 2fm.

Background
The pair grew up in County Tipperary. They were asked to compere a local GAA gala evening, and decided to perform together based on the reaction.

They now live in Cahir. Smacks is originally from Roscrea.

Career
Their podcast topped the Irish charts with listenership of over 250,000 listeners per week. They made appearances on Up for the Match, RTÉ Does Comic Relief and The Late Late Show. They have performed live shows in the 3 Arena, the UK, USA and Australia.

In 2020, they presented a travel show The 2 Johnnies Do America. In 2021, A follow up show, The 2 Johnnies Take On..., examined topics in Ireland.

In 2022, it was announced that the pair would present a weekday drive-time radio show Drive It on 2fm. Their scheduled launch was postponed by a number of weeks after a promotional video attributed to them caused offence.

See also 
 List of Irish podcasts

References

External links

Irish comedy duos
People from County Tipperary
RTÉ 2fm presenters
RTÉ television presenters
Irish podcasters
Sketch comedy troupes
People from Cahir